Peeplya village is located in Chouth ka Barwara tehsil of Sawai Madhopur district, Rajasthan, India.

References

Villages in Sawai Madhopur district